Trojes is a town, with a population of 9,680 (2020 calculation), and a municipality in the Honduran department of El Paraíso.

References 

Municipalities of the El Paraíso Department